The Only Thrill is a 1997 film directed by Peter Masterson. It stars Diane Keaton and Sam Shepard.

Plot
In Lockhart, Texas, circa 1966, Reece McHenry, whose wife is in a coma, owns a clothing store. He hires widow Carol Fritzsimmons as a seamstress in the shop and they soon begin an affair.

Reece is unable to commit to the relationship due to the circumstances of his wife. His son, Tom, meantime, has taken up with Carol's daughter, Katherine, but Katherine has commitment issues similar to those of Tom's father.

Events transpire causing the two McHenry men to lose the women in their lives. Carol must move to Canada to be with an ill sister and cannot persuade Reece to come with her. Katherine's dream is to become an actress, and when she finally gets an opportunity, she leaves Tom to burn her oats. Thirty years later, when the Fritzsimmons women return, both men and women must cope with their lifelong regrets.

Cast
Diane Keaton as Carol Fritzsimmons
Sam Shepard as Reece McHenry
Diane Lane as Katherine Fritzsimmons
Robert Patrick as Colonel Tom Ryan McHenry
Tate Donovan as Eddie
Rick Harris as extra

References

External links

1997 films
Films directed by Peter Masterson
1997 romantic drama films
1990s English-language films